Belalora is a genus of sea snails, marine gastropod mollusks in the family Mangeliidae.

Species
Species within the genus Belalora include:
 Belalora cunninghami (E. A. Smith, 1881)
 Belalora striatula (Thiele, 1912)
 Belalora weirichi(Engl, 2008) 
Speciesq brought into synonymy
 Belalora thielei Powell, 1951: synonym of Oenopota cunninghami (Smith, E.A., 1881)

References

External links
 Powell A. W. B. (1951). Antarctic and Subantarctic Mollusca: Pelecypoda and Gastropoda. Discovery Reports, 26: 47-196, pl. 5-10
 
 Kantor Y.I., Harasewych M.G. & Puillandre N. (2016). A critical review of Antarctic Conoidea (Neogastropoda). Molluscan Research. 36(3): 153-206